Thomas Tufton, 6th Earl of Thanet, 18th Baron de Clifford PC (30 August 1644 – 30 July 1729) was an English nobleman and politician.

He was the fourth son of John Tufton, 2nd Earl of Thanet and his wife Margaret Sackville, Baroness Clifford and inherited the title on the death in 1684 of his elder brother Richard Tufton, 5th Earl of Thanet. Through his maternal grandmother, he was heir to the Barony de Clifford and to vast estates in Cumberland and Westmorland. He served as hereditary High Sheriff of Westmorland from 1684 to 1729.

He gained the rank of captain in the service of the Troop of Horse. He held the office of Member of Parliament (M.P.) for Appleby between 1668 and 1679. He succeeded to the title of 6th Earl of the Isle of Thanet, co. Kent [E., 1628] on 27 April 1680. He gained the rank of colonel in 1685 in the service of the Regiment of Horse (5th Horse). He held the office of Lord-Lieutenant of Westmorland between 1685 and 1687. He held the office of Lord-Lieutenant of Cumberland between 1685 and 1687. He succeeded to the title of 18th Lord Clifford [E., 1299] on 12 December 1691, resolved by the House of Lords. He was invested as a Privy Counsellor (P.C.) from 1703 to 1707 and 1711 to 1714. He held the office of Lord-Lieutenant of Cumberland between 1712 and 1714.

On 14 August 1684, he married Lady Catharine Cavendish (d. 1712), daughter of Henry Cavendish, 2nd Duke of Newcastle. They had eight children, five of whom reached adulthood:
John Tufton, Lord Tufton (b. & d. 29 April 1686)
Thomas Tufton, Lord Tufton (b. & d. 19 November 1690)
John Tufton, Lord Tufton (b. & d. 23 September 1691)
Lady Catherine Tufton (24 April 1692 – 13 February 1734), married on 21 March 1709 Edward Watson, Viscount Sondes, and had issue.
Lady Anne Tufton (d. 22 March 1757), married on 12 February 1709 James Cecil, 5th Earl of Salisbury, and had issue.
Lady Margaret Tufton (16 June 1700 – 28 February 1775), married on 3 July 1718 Thomas Coke, 1st Earl of Leicester, and had issue.
Lady Mary Tufton (d. 12 February 1785), married first Anthony Grey, Earl of Harold (d. 1723), second on 16 May 1736 John Leveson-Gower, 1st Earl Gower, and had issue.
Lady Isabella Tufton (d. 10 January 1764), married first Lord Nassau Powlett (d. 1741), second Sir Francis Blake Delaval, and had issue.

In 1703, he was sworn a Privy Counsellor. A country gentleman and a Tory, he was noted by Swift for his "piety and charity".

On his death, his title passed to his nephew Sackville Tufton, 7th Earl of Thanet, son of his younger brother Sackville. The barony of Clifford again fell into abeyance until 1734.

References

Tufton genealogy
A Poem for the Birth-Day of the Right Honorable The Lady Catharine Tufton

1644 births
1729 deaths
17th-century English nobility
18th-century English nobility
Lord-Lieutenants of Cumberland
Lord-Lieutenants of Westmorland
Tufton, Thomas
Members of the Privy Council of England
Tufton, Thomas
High Sheriffs of Westmorland
Earls of Thanet
Barons de Clifford